McCuistion is a surname. Notable people with the surname include:

Doug McCuistion, American scientist

See also
McCuistion Glacier, a glacier in Antarctica